The 1994 Virginia Slims of Houston was a women's tennis tournament played on outdoor clay courts at the Westside Tennis Club in Houston, Texas in the United States that was part of Tier II of the 1994 WTA Tour. It was the 24th edition of the tournament and was held from March 21 through March 27, 1994.  It was also the last tournament to use the name Virginia Slims in Houston. Seventh-seeded Sabine Hack won the singles title and earned $80,000 first-prize money.

Finals

Singles

 Sabine Hack defeated  Mary Pierce 7–5, 6–4
 It was Hack's only title of the year and the 4th of her career.

Doubles

 Manon Bollegraf /  Martina Navratilova defeated  Katrina Adams /  Zina Garrison-Jackson 6–4, 6–2
 It was Bollegraf's 1st title of the year and the 14th of her career. It was Navratilova's 2nd title of the year and the 337th of her career.

References

External links
 ITF tournament edition details
 Tournament draws

Virginia Slims of Houston
Virginia Slims of Houston
Virginia Slims of Houston
Virginia Slims of Houston
Virginia Slims of Houston
Virginia Slims of Houston